Vinza is a Bantu language spoken by the Vinza people of Tanzania, approximately in the area of the town of Uvinza.  It is closely related to the languages of Rwanda and Burundi, including the Ha language of the northeastern shores of Lake Tanganyika.

References

Languages of Tanzania
Rwanda-Rundi languages